Hindi film distribution circuits comprises territories which have been created by film distributors for releasing Hindi cinema or Hindustani cinema (as it was earlier known) across India. The six distribution circuits were created in 1930s after the advent of the first talkie in 1931. These circuits were:

 Bombay circuit
 Eastern circuit
 Delhi-U.P. circuit,
 C.P.-C.I.-Rajasthan circuit
 Punjab circuit
 South circuit

Presently territories for distribution of Hindi films are divided into eleven territories. These are.

Amongst the above territories Bombay circuit is considered by the distributors as having potential for maximum earnings. An additional territory known as overseas territory also exists. However, Hindi movies in Nepal & Bhutan are released by distributors through the Eastern circuit.

References

See also

Hindi cinema